Little River County is a county located on the southwest border of the U.S. state of Arkansas, bordering a corner with Texas and Oklahoma. As of the 2020 census, the population was 12,026. The county seat is Ashdown.

Little River County is included in the Texarkana, TX-AR Metropolitan Statistical Area.

History
Little River County is Arkansas's 59th county, formed from Sevier County on March 5, 1867, during the Reconstruction era and named for the Little River. The county is separated from all other surrounding counties in the state by water (a characteristic shared only with neighboring Miller County). The Little River, Millwood Lake and the Red River form the boundaries of the county within the state.

Around 1895 the Arkansas and Choctaw Railway was built between Arkinda and Ashdown.  The line was extended from Arkinda into Oklahoma, and from Ashdown to Hope, Arkansas, in the 1902-1903 timeframe.  That line is now operated by the Kiamichi Railroad.

Geography
It is the third-smallest county in Arkansas by land area and fourth-smallest by total area.

Major highways
 Future Interstate 49
 U.S. Highway 59
 U.S. Highway 71
 Highway 32
 Highway 41
 Highway 108

Adjacent counties
Sevier County (north)
Howard County (northeast)
Hempstead County (east)
Miller County (southeast)
Bowie County, Texas (south)
McCurtain County, Oklahoma (west)

Demographics

2020 census

As of the 2020 United States census, there were 12,026 people, 5,363 households, and 3,523 families residing in the county.

2000 census
As of the 2000 census, there were 13,628 people, 5,465 households, and 3,912 families residing in the county.  The population density was 26 people per square mile (10/km2).  There were 6,435 housing units at an average density of 12 per square mile (5/km2).  The racial makeup of the county was 74.52% White, 21.27% Black or African American, 1.45% Native American, 0.20% Asian, 0.03% Pacific Islander, 0.86% from other races, and 1.67% from two or more races.  1.72% of the population were Hispanic or Latino of any race.

There were 5,465 households, out of which 31.40% had children under the age of 18 living with them, 55.60% were married couples living together, 12.30% had a female householder with no husband present, and 28.40% were non-families. 26.30% of all households were made up of individuals, and 12.00% had someone living alone who was 65 years of age or older.  The average household size was 2.46 and the average family size was 2.95.

In the county, the population was spread out, with 25.20% under the age of 18, 8.40% from 18 to 24, 25.70% from 25 to 44, 25.60% from 45 to 64, and 15.10% who were 65 years of age or older.  The median age was 38 years. For every 100 females there were 94.70 males.  For every 100 females age 18 and over, there were 90.30 males.

The median income for a household in the county was $29,417, and the median income for a family was $36,207. Males had a median income of $32,489 versus $18,435 for females. The per capita income for the county was $15,899.  About 11.90% of families and 15.40% of the population were below the poverty line, including 18.80% of those under age 18 and 17.80% of those age 65 or over.

Government

Communities

Cities
Ashdown (county seat)
Foreman
Winthrop

Towns
Ogden
Wilton

Census-designated places
 Alleene
 Yarborough Landing

Other unincorporated places

 Comet
 Richmond
 Rocky Comfort
 Cerro Gordo

Townships

 Arden
 Arkinda
 Burke
 Caney
 Cleveland (Wilton)
 Franklin (Yarborough Landing)
 Jackson (Foreman)
 Jeff Davis
 Jefferson (Ashdown)
 Jewell
 Johnson (Ogden)
 Lick Creek
 Little River (Winthrop)
 Red River
 Richland
 Wallace

Notable people
Marion H. Crank, Speaker of the Arkansas House of Representatives, 1963–1964; Democratic gubernatorial nominee, 1968; resided in Foreman, interred there at Holy Cross Cemetery
Jeff Davis (Arkansas governor), Democratic United States Senator from Arkansas and the 20th Governor of the U.S. state of Arkansas

See also
 List of lakes in Little River County, Arkansas
 National Register of Historic Places listings in Little River County, Arkansas
 Ashdown School District
 Foreman School District

References

 
1867 establishments in Arkansas
Populated places established in 1867